Active Life: Extreme Challenge (Family Trainer: Extreme Challenge in Europe and Family Trainer 2 in Japan) is a video game for the Wii produced by Bandai Namco Games. It is the sequel to the 2008 game Active Life: Outdoor Challenge and was released on August 11, 2009. It uses a mat to play minigames.

The unique pad controller is designed to connect to the Wii via its GameCube controller ports, which only exist on early Wii models, so the game is incompatible with later Wii models.

List of minigames 
Street Luge
Double Dutch (Regular)
Double Dutch (Fusion)
BASE Jumping
Kite Surfing
Inline Skating (Road Race)
Inline Skating (Big Air)
BMX (Flat Land)
BMX (Street)
BMX (Speed)
Rock Climbing (Difficult)
Rock Climbing (Speed)
Wakeboarding
Skateboarding (Vertical)
Skateboarding (Freestyle)

Reception 
Active Life: Extreme Challenge received "mixed or average reviews" according to the review aggregator Metacritic, based on 13 critic reviews.

References

2009 video games
Video games developed in Japan
Wii games
Wii-only games
Bandai Namco games
Fitness games
Tose (company) games
Multiplayer and single-player video games